The Philippine collared dove (Streptopelia dusumieri) is a species of bird in the family Columbidae. It was formerly considered a subspecies of the island collared dove (S. bitorquata).

The species occurs in the Philippines where it is called locally as bato-bato de collar.   It has also been introduced into Guam and the Northern Mariana Islands, although the population on Guam has been severely reduced by introduced brown tree snakes. 
Its natural habitats are open grassland and agricultural land with trees and scrub. It was formerly considered a subspecies of the island collared dove.

Description 
EBird describes the bird as "Brownish dove with a short collar of large dark scales, a gray head, and a pinkish flush on the neck and breast. Native to the  Philippines , where now declining and uncommon; fairly common in introduced range  Guam and the Northern Mariana Islands. Favors open forest and edges in its native range; often in towns and cities where introduced. Gives a loud, somewhat melancholy “cOO-cuh-COO.”

Breeding has been recorded in March and May in the Philippines.

Habitat and Conservation Status 
An open country species inhabiting grassland and agricultural land with trees and scrub, while introduced populations are found in urban areas. Breeding has been recorded in March and May in the Philippines 

IUCN has assessed this bird as vulnerable with its population continuing to decline. Its main threat is heavy interspecific competition from Spotted doves and Red collared doves.

Conservation actions proposed to clarify nature and extent of threat from Spotted doves and Red collared doves.. Identify remaining strongholds, monitor population trends, and assess desirability and feasibility of control of competing species.

References

Collar, N.J. 2011. Species limits in some Philippine birds including the Greater Flameback Chrysocolaptes lucidus. Forktail number 27: 29–38.

Philippine collared dove
Birds of the Philippines
Philippine collared dove